Pierre-Antoine Gillet (born 16 April 1991) is a Belgian professional basketball player for Filou Oostende of the BNXT League. He also represents the Belgian national basketball team. Standing at 6 ft 9 in (2.06 m), he plays at the Power Forward position.

Early life
Gillet started playing basketball at the age of nine.

Professional career
On August 31, 2020, Gillet signed a three-year deal with Filou Oostende of the Belgian Pro Basketball League. He helped the team win the league title, averaging 10.6 points, 4.8 rebounds, and 1.5 assists per game. Gillet re-signed with the team on August 11, 2021.

International career
He represented Belgium at the EuroBasket 2015 where they lost to Greece in eighth finals with 75–54.

References

External links
ACB.com profile

1991 births
Living people
Baloncesto Fuenlabrada players
BC Oostende players
Belgian expatriate basketball people in France
Belgian expatriate basketball people in Spain
Belgian men's basketball players
Belgium national basketball players
CB Canarias players
Élan Chalon players
Liga ACB players
Liège Basket players
People from Huy
Power forwards (basketball)
Sportspeople from Liège Province